Chaffee or Chafee is a surname which may refer to:

People:
Ada Gilmore Chaffee (1883–1955), American watercolorist and printmaker
Adna Chaffee (1842–1914), American lieutenant general
Adna R. Chaffee Jr. (1884–1941), American major general, son of Adna Chaffee
Cathleen Chaffee, American curator, art historian
Calvin C. Chaffee (1811–1896), American doctor, politician and abolitionist
Emory Leon Chaffee (1885–1975), American physicist and engineer
George D. Chafee (1839–1927), American politician and lawyer
Harold G. Chaffee (1926-2020), American football player and coach
Jerome B. Chaffee (1825–1886), American entrepreneur and senator from Colorado
John Chafee (1922–1999), American politician and Secretary of the Navy
Judith Chafee (1932–1998), American architect
Lincoln Chafee (born 1953), Rhode Island governor and former U.S. Senator; son of John Chafee
Oliver Newberry Chaffee (1910–1944), American painter and printmaker
Rick Chaffee (born 1945), American former Olympic and World Cup skier, brother of Suzy Chaffee
Roger B. Chaffee (1935–1967), American Apollo astronaut
Suzy Chaffee (born 1946), American former Olympic skier and actress
Zechariah Chafee (1885–1957), American free speech and legal scholar

Fictional characters:
Alan Chaffee, in the 1995 film Village of the Damned

See also
 Chaffey (surname)